Retour is the third compilation album of the Chilean group La Ley, which was launched in 2014 to mark the return of the group to the stage, having been nine years since their separation in 2005. This compilation album includes only songs from Warner Music.

Track listing 

 "Olvidar"
 "El Duelo" (from album Invisible)
 "Día Cero" (from album Invisible)
 "Cielo Market" (from album Invisible)
 "Hombre" (from album Invisible)
 "Ví" (from album Vértigo)
 "Ciertos Civiles" (from album Vértigo)
 "Tanta Ciudad" (from album Vértigo)
 "Aquí" (from album Uno)
 "Fuera de Mi" (from album Uno)
 "Delirando" (from album Uno)
 "Mentira" (from album La Ley MTV Unplugged)
 "Intenta Amar" (from album La Ley MTV Unplugged)
 "El Duelo" (from album La Ley MTV Unplugged)
 "Ámate y Sálvate" (from album Libertad)
 "Mi Ley" (from album Libertad)
 "Surazul" (from album Libertad)

Personnel 

 Beto Cuevas: vocals, guitars.
 Mauricio Clavería: drums.
 Pedro Frugone: guitars.

External links 
  - Complete album

2014 greatest hits albums
Spanish-language compilation albums
La Ley (band) albums